USS LST-308 was a  in the United States Navy during World War II.

Construction and career 
LST-308 was laid down on 15 September 1942 at Boston Navy Yard, Boston, Massachusetts. Launched on 9 November 1942 and commissioned on 2 January 1943.

During World War II, LST-308 was assigned to the Europe-Africa-Middle theater and later assigned to Occupation and China service in the Far East. She took part in the Sicilian occupation in Italy from 9 to 15 July 1943 and 28 July to 17 August 1943. Then the Salerno landings from 9 to 21 September of the same year.

She then participated in the Iinvasion of Normandy from 6 to 25 June 1944.

After the war, she was put to occupation service and made several trips between 2 December 1945 to 7 August 1946.

She was decommissioned on 17 December 1946 and transferred to the State Department to await her disposal, 5 December 1947.

Awards 
LST-308 have earned the following awards:

American Campaign Medal
China Service Medal
European-Africa-Middle East Campaign Medal (3 battle stars)
Asiatic-Pacific Campaign Medal
Navy Occupation Service Medal (with Asia clasp)
World War II Victory Medal

Citations

Sources 
 
 
 
 

World War II amphibious warfare vessels of the United States
Ships built in Boston
1942 ships
LST-1-class tank landing ships of the United States Navy